Lioubov Vasilieva generally often known as Liubov Vasilyeva (born 24 May 1967) is a Russian female visually impaired cross-country skier and biathlete. She has represented Russia at the Paralympics in 2006 and in 2010 claiming 9 medals in her Paralympic career including 3 gold medals in her debut Paralympic event including the cross-country skiing events during the 2006 Winter Paralympics.

Career 
Liubov Vasilieva was part of the Russian delegation at the 2006 Winter Paralympics and displayed her medal hunt as she claimed 3 gold medals in the cross-country skiing and a bronze medal in the biathlon events.

She continued her medal success at the Winter Paralympics as she clinched 5 medals during the 2010 Winter Paralympics including a gold, silver medals in the cross-country skiing and 2 silver and a bronze medal in the biathlon events.

References 

1967 births
Living people
Russian female cross-country skiers
Russian female biathletes
Cross-country skiers at the 2006 Winter Paralympics
Cross-country skiers at the 2010 Winter Paralympics
Biathletes at the 2006 Winter Paralympics
Biathletes at the 2010 Winter Paralympics
Paralympic cross-country skiers of Russia
Paralympic biathletes of Russia
Paralympic gold medalists for Russia
Paralympic silver medalists for Russia
Paralympic bronze medalists for Russia
Medalists at the 2006 Winter Paralympics
Medalists at the 2010 Winter Paralympics
Russian blind people
Paralympic medalists in cross-country skiing
Paralympic medalists in biathlon